This is a list of tartans that have been adopted by law by their respective state legislatures as official U.S. state symbols. Not all states have an official tartan.

Table

See also
District tartans of Australia
List of U.S. state, district, and territorial insignia
List of tartans
Regional tartans of Canada

References

External links

Tartans
Tartans
Tartans